Elk is a ghost town in Chase and Marion counties in the U.S. state of Kansas.  It is currently a ghost town that lays along Middle Creek northwest of Elmdale and straddled the county line between Chase and Marion County.

History

Early history

For many millennia, the Great Plains of North America were inhabited by nomadic Native Americans. From the 16th century to 18th century, the Kingdom of France claimed ownership of large parts of North America, including this area. After its defeat in the French and Indian War, France secretly ceded New France to Spain, by the Treaty of Fontainebleau.

19th century
In 1802, Spain returned most of the land to France.  In 1803, much of modern day Kansas was acquired by the United States from France as part of the 828,000 square mile Louisiana Purchase at a price of 2.83 cents per acre.

In 1854, the Kansas Territory was organized, and the following year Marion County was established, including portions of Elk. Six years later, Kansas was admitted as a state.

20th century
The community of Elk was founded in 1874, and it continued to exist into the 1920s. The town had a post office from 1874 until December 1924, when it was replaced by rural free delivery. A post office existed in Elk from August 24, 1874 to December 15, 1924.  The name of the community wasn't named for the elk in the vicinity, instead the postmaster chose a word with few letters to save time when postmarking letters, thus the short name of ELK was chosen, which became Elk.

21st century
No buildings now remain in Elk, and it is considered a Ghost Town.

Geography

Climate
The climate in this area is characterized by hot, humid summers and generally mild to cool winters.  According to the Köppen Climate Classification system, Elk has a humid subtropical climate, abbreviated "Cfa" on climate maps.

References

Further reading

 Marion County Kansas : Past and Present; Sondra Van Meter; MB Publishing House; 344 pages; 1972; LCCN 72-92041.

External links
Historical
 Marion County cemetery list, archive of KsGenWeb
 Marion County history bibliography,  Marion County school bibliography, Kansas Historical Society
Maps
 Chase County maps: Current, Historic, KDOT
 Marion County maps: Current, Historic, KDOT

Former populated places in Chase County, Kansas
Former populated places in Kansas